Digital Manga is a California-based publishing company that licenses and releases Japanese manga, anime, and related merchandise in the English language.  

Digital Manga also owns and operates eManga, a digital publishing site for manga and light novels, that publishes books and e-book editions of works from other publishers.  

The non-publishing division includes Pop Japan Travel (a tour service) and several e-retail sites for books and for import products, including Akadot Retail and Yaoi Club. 

Since 2011, Digital Manga has utilized Kickstarter for funds. The first Kickstarter project was to reprint Osamu Tezuka's titles, and the most successful project to be funded was to print the Finder series by Yamane Ayano.

Subdivisions

Digital Manga Publishing
The company has co-published manga with publishing house Dark Horse Comics, including Berserk, Hellsing, The Ring, and Trigun.

Imprints

 The DMP Books imprint is used for general-audience manga. The company prints how-to books on drawing manga, as well as online tutorials and contests, under the "Manga Academy" imprint.

 Akadot Retail was the official retail store for Juné and Digital Manga Publishing. The shop imported manga, clothing, figures, magazines, and miscellaneous merchandise from Japan.

 Juné is DMP's  (male-male romance, also known as boys' love or BL) line of manga, novels, and other related books. Until April 2006, all of DMP's  manga bore the DMP label, but starting with The Art of Loving by Eiki Eiki, a new design was displayed on the dust cover, featuring a white rose beneath Juné's text logo. The imprint was named after the Japanese magazine June, which in turn was named after Jean Genet, particularly the Japanese pronunciation of "Genet" as "Jooneh". Some Juné titles originally published by Taiyoh Tosho or Oakla Publishing are co-branded with the Japanese publisher, whose logo appears on the spine. As of October 2016, the imprint Juné and the store Akadot joined forces to become a singular shop.

 801 Media is a division of Digital Manga, Inc. and sister company to DMP, formed in 2006 to publish more explicit, uncensored  titles. These titles are available on the new Juné website as of October 2016. In June 2016, Libre Publishing terminated their partnership with Digital Manga Publishing, affecting the release of their  titles.

The name DokiDoki comes from the onomatopoeia for a heartbeat in Japanese.

It publishes  (young adult men's)  manga.

The imprint was formed in 2019.

Publications

Don't Rush Love
L'Etoile Solitaire
La Satanica
Little Cry Baby
Lover's Flat
Our Everlasting
Romantic Illusions
The King of Debt
Kimagure Orange Road
Yellow

Osamu Tezuka series
Alabaster
Record of the Glass Castle
Melody of Iron
The Crater
Under the Air
Ludwig B
Barbera
Clockwork Apple
Brave Dan
Crime And Punishment
Unico (2nd edition)
Swallowing the Earth
Atomcat
Triton of the Sea
Storm Fairy
The Shinsengumi
Captain Ken
New Treasure Island
Leo the Lion Cub
Wonder 3 Omnibus
Mr. Cactus
Age of Adventure
The Castle Of Dawn
Lemon Kid

References

External links

 
 Official website for Juné
 Official website for Lilyka
 Official website for Project-H

Companies based in Los Angeles County, California
Book publishing companies based in California
Manga distributors
Gardena, California
Publishing companies established in 1996
1996 establishments in California